The Gay Football Supporters Network National League (often referred to as the GNL) is an amateur league competition for gay football clubs across the United Kingdom.  The league is associated with the GFSN - football supporters group catering for the LGBT (lesbian, gay, bisexual and transgender) community.  The league was formed in 2002 with four founder members, and has steadily grown to fifteen teams since its inception plus five associate members who play in the GFSN National Cup. It is the only national LGBT league in the world.

There is a strong feeling of community across the league, born out of the GFSN. Over a match-day weekend, it is likely that both teams will socialise before (and after) the match, which has led to close friendships, friendly rivalries, maybe more.  This community-ethos and friendliness of the league is an important factor in its success, although in recent times a very definite competitive edge has started to appear.

History
In the middle of the 1990s a number of gay football clubs were forming across the United Kingdom, primarily to offer LGBT people in their local region the opportunity to play football in a welcoming and friendly environment.  As the teams grew in size, 5-a-side tournaments and 11-a-side friendly fixtures were organised between teams.

Eventually in 2002, a competitive league was formed, founded by four teams; Yorkshire Terriers F.C, Leicester Wildecats F.C, Leftfooters F.C. (based in London), and Bristol Panthers F.C.  The first GNL fixture kicked off on Sunday 29 September 2002, with Leicester Wildecats defeating Yorkshire Terriers 5-1.

The GFSN National League has no affiliation with the Football Association (FA), and is not linked to the National League System, although the GFSN itself does have a relationship with the FA in its attempts to eradicate discrimination and homophobia from football.

Format And Rules
The GFSN National League does not require teams to "register" players in advance of a season/match.  A team can field players of any sexuality or gender, making the league unique in that both woman and men take part together.  Players do not have to be pre-registered before they play, unlike normal local amateur leagues.

The competition rules are exactly the same as normal 11-a-side FA rules, with one alteration to Law 3 - The Number of Players.  Teams are permitted to make rolling substitutions, and players are permitted to be substituted back on to the field of play even if they have been earlier substituted off the pitch.

Inaugural 2002/2003 Season
The season ended in exhilarating (and some say controversial) style with the Bristol Panthers becoming the first GNL Champions, after defeating Leftfooters FC 16-0.  Bristol needed to win the match by 13 clear goals to grasp the championship, and rumours consumed the league that Bristol had fielded 'ringers' to ensure the result.

As the league does not register players this rumour was impossible to prove, and the Bristol teamsheet for the Leftfooters match was broadly similar to previous games in the season. However, there is now a strong sense amongst the competing teams that the fielding of "ringers" should be avoided, and all players must subscribe to the ethos of the league. In reality, it's almost impossible to regulate this philosophy and is reliant on the goodwill of the clubs.

Previous winners

Expansion

Since formation, the league initially expanded slowly to include newly formed teams across the country. Brighton Bandits (renamed in summer 2012 as GFC Brighton & Hove) joined for the 2003/2004 season, and Village Manchester FC were accepted into the league in 2005/2006 - replacing the then-champions Bristol Panthers, who dropped out citing lack of players.

More recently, the popularity of gay football across the country has increased.  Many new teams have formed, and three were accepted into the league for the 2006/2007 season:  Birmingham Blaze FC, London Titans FC, and GFC Bournemouth, doubling the size of the original league. The fixture format was changed to a Six Nations style format - either home or away - with home advantage alternating annually.

Two further clubs were accepted into the league for 2007/08 season: London Falcons FC and Nottingham Ball Bois FC.

In 2008/09, Village Manchester withdrew from the league and were replaced by HotScots FC of Edinburgh, and GFC Bournemouth re-branded as GFC Bournemouth & Hampshire to reflect their growing number of players from Poole, Southampton and Portsmouth. The GFSN branch of London Falcons FC also separated from their parent club and re-branded as Falcons GFC, now existing as an independent club. Nottingham Ball Bois, in only their second season, went on to win the League with a game in hand.

The league remained as a single division for the 2009/10 season, with twelve teams taking part (following the successful league applications of Cardiff Dragons FC and Newcastle Panthers FC).

The players in the league are amateurs and do not receive any fees or subsidies for taking part.  Teams only receive funds from local sponsors, fundraisers, or shirt sponsorship. The increasing number of teams (meaning more travel and associated costs) created both a financial and time-consuming burden on players to attend all matches and events throughout a season.

Therefore, the league split into two divisions of six in 2010/11 to minimise travelling and costs. GFC Bournemouth & Hampshire FC withdrew, but were replaced by Trowbridge Tigers FC who joined as the League's first majority straight team.

In 2011/12 three new teams were welcomed into the league - Bristol Panthers FC (who had re-formed in 2009), Devon Lions FC, and Glasgow's Saltire Thistle FC. The additions led to a further reconstruction, with three leagues of five created and the return of home and away games. London Titans FC became the first club to successfully defend the title.

2012/13 Season
Two new teams were admitted into the league in 2012/13 - Mersey Marauders FC from Liverpool and Wolverhampton Harts GFC (renamed in October 2013 as Wolves Warriors AFC). Devon Lions FC withdrew from the league, though remain active and are invited to smaller-sided GFSN tournaments. GFC Brighton & Hove withdrew from the league towards the end of the season, though remain as GFSN League associate members. The league celebrated its tenth anniversary on 29 September 2012, and London Falcons GFC won the league with one match to spare.

2013/14 Season
Fifteen clubs are competing in three divisions, with London Falcons GFC looking to defend their title, and Hotscots FC and Saltire Thistle FC taking part in the league's first all-Scottish derby matches. Founding members Yorkshire Terriers FC and Leicester Wildecats FC make up the top flight.

National Knock-out Cup Competition
The GFSN Cup was introduced for the 2006/2007 season, when the league expanded to eight teams. It was felt that playing 14 home and away league fixtures was too much for an amateur national league. The introduction of the Six Nations format to the League freed up more space in the GFSN calendar - and thus a knock-out cup competition was introduced.

The GFSN Cup is open to both members of the GFSN National League and Associate Members; Associate Members include those clubs who have yet to apply for league membership.

For the 2009/10 season, the GFSN Cup became a voluntary competition which would only take place if a minimum of eight teams enter. However, all clubs have continued to enter to date, with the current fifteen League teams and five associate members choosing to participate in 2013/14.

Associate Clubs
Stonewall Football Club, a gay team based in London, do not compete in the Gay National League, instead taking part in the Middlesex County League - although they do have second and third teams that take part in friendlies and other tournaments including the GFSN Cup and other GFSN-related tournaments.

Village Manchester FC also compete in their local FA league and the GFSN Cup, though have expressed interest in re-joining the GFSN League following their withdrawal in 2008.

London Phoenix FC and Millwall Romans FC compete in The London Unity League (otherwise known as the L.U.L.), but also play in the GFSN Cup.

GFC Brighton & Hove are the fifth associate member club.

Other Clubs
There are also several other LGBT-friendly teams around the UK & Ireland which do not currently participate in the GFSN League or Cup: GFC Bournemouth & Hampshire and Devon Lions FC remain in existence and are invited to participate in smaller-sided GFSN-related tournaments and Bexley Invicta FC (SE London/NW Kent). Ireland's Dublin Devils FC entered the Cup for the 2021/22 season in their own right having reached the semi-finals in their debut year as part of a combined Ireland team in 2018/19. Attempts to start up a club in Belfast are reportedly underway.

All new clubs are eligible to apply for entry to the league and/or cup, as are previous league members - although entry into the competitions is decided at a meeting of the current league clubs' managers.

Other Leagues
The other established gay football league in Britain is The London Unity League (otherwise known as the L.U.L.) which caters for players representing GFSN clubs in the London area generally. Two similar leagues have recently been set up in the Midlands and South West England.

See also
 Gay Football Supporters Network
 Homosexuality in English football
 International Gay and Lesbian Football Association
 List of IGLFA member clubs
 List of LGBT sportspeople

References

External links
 Gay Football Supporters Network homepage
 GFSN League homepage

GFSN League Clubs:
 Nottingham Ball Bois F.C. homepage 
 Yorkshire Terriers F.C. homepage 
 Leicester Wildecats F.C. homepage
 HotScots F.C. homepage
 London Falcons F.C. homepage
 London Titans F.C. homepage
 Leftfooters F.C. homepage
 Newcastle Panthers F.C. homepage
 Birmingham Blaze F.C. homepage
 Cardiff Dragons F.C. homepage
 Bristol Panthers F.C. homepage
 Saltire Thistle F.C. homepage
 Trowbridge Tigers F.C. homepage
 Mersey Marauders homepage
 Wolves Warriors A.F.C. homepage

Associate and other GFSN-affiliated clubs:
 Village Manchester F.C. homepage
 Stonewall F.C. homepage
 London Phoenix F.C. homepage
 London Romans F.C. homepage
 GFC Brighton & Hove homepage
 GFC Bournemouth & Hampshire F.C. homepage
 Devon Lions F.C. homepage 
 Dublin Devils F.C. homepage
 Bexley Invicta F.C. homepage

LGBT sports organisations in the United Kingdom
Association football organizations